Atlantic Sounding Co. v. Townsend, 557 U.S. 404 (2009), was a decision by the Supreme Court of the United States holding that a seaman may recover punitive damages from his employer for failure to pay maintenance and cure.  Townsend reversed a line of cases, starting with Guevara v. Maritime Overseas Corp. in the United States Court of Appeals for the Fifth Circuit (New Orleans), that restricted damages in maritime personal injury cases only to "pecuniary" damages.  Consequently, a seaman can now recover both attorney's fees and punitive damages for the willful and wanton refusal of a shipowner to provide medical care to a seaman injured on the job.  The Court's 5-4 opinion was delivered by Justice Clarence Thomas.

The Court explained that Congress never used the words "pecuniary" or "non-pecuniary" to describe the damages available for personal injuries (injuries not causing death) under either the Jones Act or the Federal Employers Liability Act.  Congress merely said "damages"; hence, any limitation on those damages to "pecuniary damages" was a creation of the courts, not Congress.  The Court stated that it "will not attribute words to Congress that Congress did not say."

External links
 

United States Supreme Court cases
2009 in United States case law
United States Supreme Court cases of the Roberts Court
United States admiralty case law